Standings and results of the Regular Season of the Eurocup Basketball 2009–10 basketball tournament.

All times given below are in Central European Time.

Group A

Game 1

Game 2

Game 3

Game 4

Game 5

Game 6

Group B

Game 1

Game 2

Game 3

Game 4

Game 5

Game 6

Group C

Game 1

Game 2

Game 3

Game 4

Game 5

Game 6

Group D

Game 1

Game 2

Game 3

Game 4

Game 5

Game 6

Group E

Game 1

Game 2

Game 3

Game 4

Game 5

Game 6

Group F

Game 1

Game 2

Game 3

Game 4

Game 5

Game 6

Group G

Game 1

Game 2

Game 3

Game 4

Game 5

Game 6

Group H

Game 1

Game 2

Game 3

Game 4

Game 5

Game 6

External links
Results

2009–10 Eurocup Basketball